Tyl may refer to:

 IATA code of the Cap. FAP Victor Montes Arias Airport in Talara, Piura, Peru
 A name used once for the star Epsilon Draconis
 Rear Services of the Armed Forces of the Russian Federation

People with the surname
Josef Kajetán Tyl (1808–1856), Czech playwright
Noel Jan Tyl (born 1936), American astrologer